I Need You or I Need U may refer to:

Films
 I Need You (film), a 1944 German film

Music

Albums 
 I Need You (album), by LeAnn Rimes, 2001
 I Need You (Bestie EP) (reissue of Hot Baby) or the title song, 2014
 I Need You (K.Will EP) or the title song, 2012
 I Need You (The Walker Brothers EP) or the title song, 1966

Songs 
 "I Need You" (America song), 1972
 "I Need You" (Beatles song), 1965
 "I Need You" (Dave Gahan song), 2003
 "I Need You" (Eric Carmen song), 1977; first sung by Frankie Valli, and then covered by the Euclid Beach Band (1979) and 3T (1996)
 "I Need You" (Jars of Clay song), 2002
 "I Need You" (The Kinks song), 1965
 "I Need You" (LeAnn Rimes song), 2000
 "I Need You" (Marc Anthony song), 2002
 "I Need You" (Maurice White song), 1985
 "I Need You" (N-Dubz song), 2009
 "I Need You" (Paris Hilton song), 2018
 "I Need You" (Relient K song), 2007
 "I Need You" (Tim McGraw and Faith Hill song), 2007
 "I Need You" (Trisha Yearwood song), 1997
 "I Need U" (BTS song), 2015
 "I Need U" (Lay song), 2017
 "I Need You", by Alicia Keys from As I Am, 2007
 "I Need You", by Armin van Buuren from Balance, 2019
 "I Need You", by Billy Squier from Don't Say No, 1981
 "I Need You", by B.V.S.M.P., 1988
 "I Need You", by the D.E.Y., 2008
 "I Need You", by Deuce from On the Loose!, 1995
 "I Need You", by Eurythmics from Savage, 1987
 "I Need You", by The Hedrons, 2006
 "I Need You", by Jon Batiste from We Are, 2021
 "I Need You", by Lita Roza, 1957
 "I Need You", by Lynyrd Skynyrd from Second Helping, 1974
 "I Need You", by M83 from Divergent: Original Motion Picture Soundtrack, 2014
 "I Need You", by the Muffs from The Muffs, 1993
 "I Need You", by the Naked Brothers Band from the film The Naked Brothers Band: The Movie, 2005
 "I Need You", by Nick Cave and the Bad Seeds from Skeleton Tree, 2016
 "I Need You", by Pat DiNizio from Pat DiNizio, 2007
 "I Need You", by Paul Carrack from Suburban Voodoo, 1982
 "I Need You", by Paul Revere & the Raiders from Alias Pink Puzz, 1969
 "I Need You", by Paula Abdul from Forever Your Girl, 1988
 "I Need You", by Timbuk3 from Greetings from Timbuk3, 1986
 "I Need You", by Westlife from Westlife, 1999
 "I Need You", by the Who from A Quick One, 1966
 "I Need You (For Someone)", by the Jam from This Is the Modern World, 1977
 "I Need You (Option A)" and "I Need You (Mindwarp Remix)", by Pendulum from 3 Knocks, 1997
 "I Need You (That Thing You Do)", from the soundtrack of the film That Thing You Do!, 1996

See also
 Kailangan Ko'y Ikaw (TV series) (lit. I Need You), a 2013 Philippine series
 Need You (disambiguation)